Akademik Stadium is a football stadium located in Sofia, Bulgaria with a capacity of 8,000 sitting and 2,000 standing for sports and expandable to 22,000 for concerts. The stadium complex consists of 1 grass field, 2 additional fields, 4 changing rooms and 1 cafe-bar, as well as halls for Tae Bo, boxing, judo, a dancesport hall and a gym.

Concerts 
 8 September 1992: Ian Gillan Band
 28 August 1999: The Prodigy
 16 July 2000: Motörhead
 29 July 2000: Alice Cooper - "Live from the Brutal Planet"
 3 July 2002: Halford / Slayer - "Arena Muzika"
 14 June 2003: Whitesnake - "Arena Muzika"
 18 June 2004: Judas Priest / Queensrÿche - "Arena Muzika"
 21 June 2004: Peter Gabriel - "Arena Muzika"
 1 June 2007: INXS
 4 April 2008:  Whitesnake / Def Leppard
 16 May 2008: KISS
 29 June 2009: Saga / Queensrÿche / Limp Bizkit - "Rock the Balkans"
 25 October 2010: Scorpions - "Get Your Sting and Blackout World Tour"
6 July 2014 30 Seconds to Mars / The Offspring

External links
 StadiumDB profile

References 

Football venues in Bulgaria
Music venues in Bulgaria
Sports venues in Sofia